Robert Cooper Phillips (April 27, 1975 – October 9, 2015), better known by his stage name Koopsta Knicca, was an American rapper. He was best known as one of the members of the Memphis rap group Three 6 Mafia, as well as a member of the rap collective Da Mafia 6ix alongside DJ Paul, Crunchy Black and Gangsta Boo.

Phillips released a solo album produced by DJ Paul, Da Devil's Playground in 1994. The album was later mostly re-recorded as well as remastered in 1999 featuring an alternate tracklist.

Unable to make shows and videos due to legal issues, he left Three 6 Mafia in 2000. He continued his solo work with albums Da K Project, De Inevitable, and The Mind of Robert Cooper. Beginning in 2012, Phillips started work on his latest studio album entitled Da Devil's Playground 2 and also a mixtape entitled Skrewged. He had also released A Murda 'N Room 8 EP (2010) and Decepticons – Return Of The Gods (2012). Phillips frequently collaborated with former Three 6 Mafia associate Lord Infamous and appeared on a collaborative album under the group name Da Mafia 6ix.

Career 
Phillips joined the Memphis rap group Three 6 Mafia in 1991. According to Lord Infamous, he went to the same high school as DJ Paul and later Juicy J. He was featured on numerous Three 6 Mafia albums including the platinum-selling When the Smoke Clears: Sixty 6, Sixty 1. He left the group after the release of the album in 2000 due to his incarceration, which made him unable to make shows and videos in addition to breaching his contract with Sony. DJ Paul issued a statement regarding Phillips' death and mentioned that they were in the process of starting what would have been his 11th solo album, Da Devil's Playground 2, shortly before his death.

Death 
On October 6, 2015, Phillips suffered a stroke and was put on life support. At around 1:00 am on October 9, Phillips was removed from life support.

Discography 
Solo
Da Devil's Playground: Underground Tape (1994) (produced by DJ Paul)
Da Devil's Playground: Underground Solo (1999) (produced by DJ Paul)
Da K Project (2002)
Undaground Muzic, Vol. 1 (2003)
De Inevitable (2004)
The Mind Of Robert Cooper (2005)
A Murda 'N Room 8 (September 28, 2010)
Decepticon: The Return Of The Gods (October 31, 2012)
Aliens vs Humans (September 17, 2013)
Skrewged (October 1, 2013)
Da Devil's Playground 2 (Un-released) (2012)
Da Devil's Playground 2 (Produced by DJ Paul) (TBA)

With Three 6 Mafia
Smoked Out, Loced Out (1994)
Mystic Stylez (1995)
Live By Yo Rep (1995)
Chapter 1: The End (1996)
Chapter 2: World Domination (1998)
Underground Vol. 1: 1991–1994 (1999)
Underground Vol. 2: Club Memphis (1999)
Underground Vol. 3: Kings of Memphis (2000)
When the Smoke Clears: Sixty 6, Sixty 1 (2000)
Most Known Hits (2005)*
Smoked Out Music Greatest Hits (2006)*
Prophet's Greatest Hits (2007)*
* despite not being a member of Three 6 Mafia at the time, Koopsta's verses were still featured on the album.

With Da Mafia 6ix
6ix Commandments (2013)
Hear Sum Evil (2014)
Watch What U Wish... (2015)

With The Killjoy Club
Reindeer Games (2014)

With Prophet Posse/Hypnotize Camp Posse
Body Parts (1998)
Three 6 Mafia Presents: Hypnotize Camp Posse (2000)

Collaborations 
 "The Airport" with Indo G, Kelo, K-Rock and T-Rock
 "Cars, Clothes, Hoes" with Gangsta Boo
 "Author Of Authorz" with Lord Infamous
 "Killin Spree" with Nitemare Squad and Ezider
 "Whop Dat Bitch, Hurt Dat Hoe" with MC-Mack, Scan Man and Pimp Teddy
 "Losin My Mind" with T-Rock, Mr. Sche and Boss Bytch
 "Yeah Hoe" with Gangsta Boo, Indo G, Young Snipe, E-Gutta, Kelo and Nick Scarfo
 "My Posse" with Pastor Troy, Yo Gotti, Nick Scarfo and MC-Mack
 "The Dick" with Indo G, Nick Scarfo and Kelo
 "The Answer" with Scan Man, T-Rock, K-Rock, Cydelix, Total Kayos and MC-Mack
 "48 Hrz. To Respond (2000 Rap Dope Game)" with Kingpin Skinny Pimp
 "Wanksta" with Scan Man and Ken Sample
 "Fie Cap" with Scan Man
 "Diabolical" with C-Mob and Bizarre
 "Stick Em Up Buck Em Down" with J Blaque
 "War Love" with Lord Infamous
 "Smokin Song" with Mac Montese
 "Hit Em' In The Face" with Ponick 51/50
 "Murda Klan" with Renizance of Immortal Soldierz, Twisted Insane & Lord Infamous
 "Lost Leaders" with Mexiveli, KingPin Skinny Pimp & Lil Wyte
 "We Are What We Are" with Dark Half & SickTanicK

References 

1975 births
2015 deaths
African-American crunk musicians
African-American male rappers
Deaths from intracranial aneurysm
Gangsta rappers
Horrorcore artists
People from Nashville, Tennessee
Prophet Entertainment
Rappers from Memphis, Tennessee
Southern hip hop musicians
Three 6 Mafia members
20th-century African-American people
21st-century African-American people